Stefanos Tsitsipas defeated Roberto Bautista Agut in the final, 6–4, 3–6, 7–6(7–2) to win the men's singles tennis title at the 2022 Mallorca Championships.

Daniil Medvedev was the defending champion, but lost in the quarterfinals to Bautista Agut.

Seeds
The top four seeds receive a bye into the second round.

Draw

Finals

Top half

Bottom half

Qualifying

Seeds

Qualifiers

Draw

First qualifier

Second qualifier

Third qualifier

Fourth qualifier

References

External links
Main draw
Qualifying draw

Mallorca Championships - Singles